Equatorial Guinea is known for human rights abuses. Under the current government it has "limited ability of citizens to change their government; increased reports of unlawful murders of civilians by security forces; government-sanctioned kidnappings; systematic torture of prisoners and detainees by security forces; life threatening conditions in prisons and detention facilities; impunity; arbitrary arrest and detention and incommunicado detention; harassment and deportation of foreign residents with limited due process; judicial corruption and lack of due process; restrictions on the right to privacy; restrictions on freedom of speech and of the press; restrictions on the rights of assembly, association, and movement; government corruption; violence and discrimination against women; suspected trafficking in persons; discrimination against ethnic minorities; and restrictions on labor rights."

There were multiple irregularities in the 2009 legislative elections, but they were considered an improvement over the flawed 2002 and 2004 elections. There is a cult of personality in Equatorial Guinea around the leader. In order to improve his image, long time autocrat Teodoro Obiang hired Racepoint, a global marketing and  public relations firm, for $60,000 a year to improve Equatorial Guinea's image. Transparency International includes Equatorial Guinea as one of its most 12 corrupt states.

Equatorial Guinea also had the death penalty. In September 2022, this was cancelled by President Teodoro Obiang Nguema Mbasogo and Vice President Teodoro Nguema Obiang Mangue.

Political prisoners
In June 2007 the UN Working Group on Arbitrary Detention visited Equatorial Guinea and reported that political prisoners are sometimes tried by military rather than civilian courts. Nongovernmental sources cited around 100 prisoners jailed for political reasons, with many held at the notorious Black Beach Prison.

According to parliamentary testimony, on October 6, 2007, Salvador Ndong Nguema, a member of the opposition party Convergence for Social Democracy (CPDS), died from torture in custody of security forces. Two members of the security forces were taken in, but released and assigned to other security duties.

On March 12–13, 2009, Saturnino Ncogo Mbomio, a member of banned political party died in police detention at Evinayong, ostensibly in possession of weapons for a coup. He died from a fractured skull, allegedly gotten in a suicide attempt falling from his bunk bed.

In September 2017, cartoonist Ramón Esono Ebalé was imprisoned at Black Beach in Malabo for creating work critical of the ruling party in Equatorial Guinea. He was released in March 2018.

Historical situation
The chart shows Equatorial Guinea's ratings since 1972 in the Freedom in the World reports, published annually by Freedom House. A rating of 1 is "most free" and 7 is "least free".

International treaties
Equatorial Guinea's stances on international human rights treaties are as follows:

See also 

Human trafficking in Equatorial Guinea
Internet censorship and surveillance in Equatorial Guinea 
LGBT rights in Equatorial Guinea
Politics of Equatorial Guinea

Notes 
1.Note that the "Year" signifies the "Year covered". Therefore the information for the year marked 2008 is from the report published in 2009, and so on.
2.As of January 1.
3.The 1982 report covers the year 1981 and the first half of 1982, and the following 1984 report covers the second half of 1982 and the whole of 1983. In the interest of simplicity, these two aberrant "year and a half" reports have been split into three year-long reports through interpolation.

References

External links
 2012 Annual Report, by Amnesty International
 Freedom in the World 2012 Report, by Freedom House
 World Report 2012, by Human Rights Watch